Amarillo Slim Dealer's Choice is a 1991 video game published by Villa Crespo Software, bearing the name of poker player Amarillo Slim.

Gameplay
Amarillo Slim Dealer's Choice is a game in which players have their choice in poker games, with 7 basic versions of poker, and allows players to use house rules.

Reception
Alan Emrich reviewed the game for Computer Gaming World, and stated that "Amarillo Slim Dealer's Choice is a great leap for poker enthusiasts. With the most opponents, most options and best gameplay, Amarillo Slim Dealer's Choice wins the pot, hands down!"

Reviews
Game Player's PC Strategy Guide
Video Games & Computer Entertainment
Compute!

References

1991 video games
DOS games
DOS-only games
Poker video games
Video games based on real people
Video games developed in the United States